No Other Woman is a 1933 American pre-Code romantic melodrama film starring Irene Dunne, and featuring Charles Bickford, Gwili Andre and Eric Linden.  It was directed by J. Walter Ruben from a screenplay by Wanda Tuchock and Bernard Schubert based on the play Just a Woman by Eugene Walter, which ran for 136 performances on Broadway in 1916, and was previously made into silent films called Just a Woman in 1918

Plot
Anna (Irene Dunne) yearns to escape from Pittsburgh and tells her boyfriend, steelworker Jim Stanley (Charles Bickford) that she will never marry a steelworker, but he changes her mind. After their marriage, however, she does not abandon her dream; she puts away as much money as she can and runs a boarding house to build up their savings.

When her friend Joe (Eric Linden) discovers a way to make a permanent dye out of the waste products of the steel mill, she sees her chance. Despite his initial opposition, Jim supports his wife. He tells Joe that he can either sell his invention to the mill owners or they can go into partnership and manufacture the dye themselves. Joe chooses the latter, and Jim builds up the business and becomes extremely rich. Anna resides in a mansion with their young son, Bobbie.

On a business trip to New York City, Jim is attracted to golddigger Margot (Gwili Andre) and they begin an affair. When Anna finds out, she confronts her husband. He says he loves Margot and wants a divorce, but Anna refuses to give him one, forcing him to take her to court.

At the trial, several bribed witnesses claim that Anna herself has a lover. Under the relentless questioning of Jim's lawyer, Bonelli (J. Carrol Naish), she breaks down in tears. When she learns that she will lose custody of Bobbie, Anna desperately claims that Jim is not the boy's father. This claim causes Jim to admit he paid his servants to perjure themselves and is sentenced to jail. While in prison, his business is wiped out by the scandal and he is left penniless.

When he is released after a year, he is too ashamed to go see his wife. He returns to work in the steel mill, but she finds and embraces him.

Cast

 Irene Dunne as Anna Stanley
 Charles Bickford as Jim Stanley
 Gwili Andre as Margot
 Eric Linden as Joe
 Christian Rub as Eli Bogavitch
 Leila Bennett as Susie
 J. Carrol Naish as Bonelli
 Buster Miles as Bobbie Stanley
 Frederick Burton as Anderson
 Theodore von Eltz as Sutherland, Anna's alleged lover
 Edwin Stanley as the judge
 Brooks Benedict as the chauffeur

Production
No Other Woman had the working titles "Man and Wife" and "Just a Woman", the latter being the name of the play it was based on and of the two silent films made from the play earlier. On the film's copyright records, Owen Francis is listed as the writer of the film story, but a news item published at the time said that Francis also worked on the screenplay.

Reception
The critical response to the film was negative.  In The New York Times, Mordaunt Hall wrote that "J. Walter Ruben's direction is un-imaginative and the script from which he had to work is dull. As the narrative comes to the screen it lacks suspense and where it might be reasonably dramatic it is hopelessly implausible." He found Dunne to be "attractive and sincere" and said that Bickford "struggles valiantly with his part", while the second leads, Gwili Andre and Eric Linden were "merely acceptable."

References

External links
 
 
 
 

1933 films
1933 romantic drama films
American romantic drama films
1930s English-language films
American black-and-white films
American films based on plays
Films directed by J. Walter Ruben
Films with screenplays by Wanda Tuchock
Remakes of American films
Sound film remakes of silent films
Melodrama films
RKO Pictures films
1930s American films